Henry Sutton may refer to:
Henry Sutton (instrument maker) (1637–1665), English instrument-maker
Henry Gawen Sutton (1837–1891), English physician
Henry Sutton (inventor) (1855–1912), Australian inventor
Henry Sutton (sailor) (1868–1936), Olympic sailor
Henry Sutton (novelist) (born 1963), British author
Henry Sutton, a pseudonym for American author David R. Slavitt
Henry Septimus Sutton (1825–1901), English journalist and temperance activist
Henry Sutton (priest), Anglican priest
Henry Sutton (MP) (died 1416), MP for Warwickshire and Nottinghamshire